Tyrocinium Chymicum was a published set of chemistry lecture notes started by Jean Beguin in 1610 in Paris, France. It has been cited as the first chemistry textbook (as opposed to that for alchemy). Many of the preparations were pharmaceutical in nature.

References

External links
 Antonio Clericuzio, Chemical Textbooks in the Seventeenth Century
 Tyrocinium Chymicum (1643) 

1610 books
History of chemistry
Chemistry books
1610 in science